Richard John Holden (born 11 March 1985) is a British politician who has served as the Member of Parliament (MP) for North West Durham since the 2019 general election. He is the first Conservative MP in the constituency's history. Holden has served as Parliamentary Under Secretary of State for Roads and Local Transport since October 2022.

Early life and career
Holden was born in Blackburn, Lancashire, to Mark and Joan Holden. He grew up in Grindleton, a village in the Ribble Valley area. Holden attended Grindleton Primary School, Ermysted's Grammar School in Skipton and Queen Elizabeth's Grammar School in Blackburn. He then went to St Mary's College in the town, before studying at the London School of Economics. He graduated with a BSc in Government and History in 2007. Holden was employed as a waiter and bar staff for Emporium Ltd from 2002 to 2006.

Holden started work at Conservative Campaign Headquarters (CCHQ) in August 2007, initially as a Data Entry Officer. The following year, he became a Media Monitoring Officer, and was a Duty Press Officer from 2008 to 2010. Holden was Political Press Advisor from 2010 to 2012, and promoted to Deputy Head of Press in 2012.

At the 2015 general election he stood unsuccessfully as a Conservative candidate in the Labour held seat of Preston. After the election, he became a special adviser to Lord Privy Seal and Leader of the House of Lords Baroness Stowell of Beeston, before leaving to work for Theresa May's 2016 Conservative Party leadership election campaign. He also worked for Stowell's successor as Leader of the House of Lords, Baroness Evans of Bowes Park, before becoming a special adviser to the Secretary of State for Defence, Sir Michael Fallon, between October 2016 and April 2017.

Holden became a special adviser to former Secretary of State for Transport Chris Grayling in December 2018, before leaving to work on Boris Johnson's 2019 Conservative Party leadership election campaign. He then worked as a special adviser to Secretary of State for Education Gavin Williamson from August to November 2019. When Parliament was dissolved for the election, Holden began working for CCHQ, before being selected as a PPC for the Labour-held seat of North West Durham.

Parliamentary career 
Holden was elected as the MP for North West Durham at the 2019 general election with a majority of 1,144 votes. He is the first Conservative to represent the constituency. It had previously been considered a safe Labour seat as it had been represented by a member of that party ever since its re-establishment in 1950.

Holden was a member of the Public Accounts Committee between March 2020 and March 2022. Since he became an MP he has written a fortnightly column for the political blog ConservativeHome. Holden was elected to the Executive of the 1922 Committee in July 2021. He is on the committee of the All-Party Parliamentary Group on Gambling-Related Harm, and has spoken and written extensively about his view that there must be tighter regulation of online gambling.

He led a campaign to reverse the increase in Vehicle Excise Duty (VED) paid on new motorhomes. The tax had been increased in September 2019 in response to EU regulation 2018/1832. In the March 2020 Budget the Chancellor of the Exchequer, Rishi Sunak, announced that the VED increase would be reversed, a tax cut worth £25 million a year to consumers and the industry.

In March 2021 Holden led a group of 80 Conservative MPs in writing to the Chancellor of the Exchequer asking him to introduce a new lower duty for beer sold on draught in pubs. He continued his campaign alongside fellow Conservative MP Mike Wood in meetings with Treasury Ministers, and in October 2021 he gathered more than 100 Conservative MPs to push the issues ahead of the 2021 Budget. In the 2021 Budget the government announced a new Draught Beer Duty rate for pubs and clubs 5 per cent lower than standard beer duty, cutting the tax on beer and cider sold in pubs by £100 million a year. Rishi Sunak credited both Holden and Wood for campaigning on the issue in his Budget Speech.

On 22 April 2022 Holden called for Durham Constabulary to investigate Keir Starmer, the Leader of the Labour Party, following reports in the media regarding potential breaches of COVID-19 regulations by attending a staff gathering during an election campaign that month. Durham Constabulary announced an investigation into the event on 6 May 2022. 8 July 2022, Durham Constabulary announced that they would not be issuing any fixed penalty notices as they determined the gathering was covered by the "reasonably necessary work" exception in the regulations.

Holden endorsed Rishi Sunak in the July–September 2022 Conservative Party leadership election.

Personal life
He is a member of the Carlton Club in London and the Steel Club in Consett. In May 2021 Holden was fined £100 for dropping a cigarette outside an election count venue during the 2021 local elections. He had previously urged constituents not to be "litter tossers".

References

External links

1985 births
Living people
Conservative Party (UK) MPs for English constituencies
UK MPs 2019–present